Abubakar Siddique (born 19 August 1936) is a Bangladeshi poet, novelist, short-story writer and critic.

Works

Novels
 Jalarakshas (The Water Demon) (1985) 
 Kharadaha (Flame of Drought) (1987) 
 Barudpora Prohor (Gun-Powder Time) (1966)
 Ekatturer Hridobhasma (The Heart Ash of 1971) (1997)

Awards
 Bangla Academy Literary Award (1988)
 Bangladesh Kathashilpi Sangsad Prize
 Bangabhasha Sanskriti Prasar Samity Award (Kolkata)
 Khulna Sahitya Parishad Award
 Bagerhat Foundation Award
 Rishij Medal
 Bangladesh Lekhika Sangha Gold Medal

References

Bengali writers
Bengali-language writers
Bengali novelists
Bangladeshi male novelists
1936 births
Living people
Recipients of Bangla Academy Award
Recipients of Mazharul Islam Poetry Award
People from Bagerhat District
Academic staff of Notre Dame College, Dhaka